Nassarius oneratus, common name the loaded nassa, is a species of sea snail, a marine gastropod mollusc in the family Nassariidae, the nassa mud snails or dog whelks.

Description
The length of the shell varies between 10 mm and 18 mm.

Distribution
This species occurs in the Indo-West Pacific off La Réunion and the Mascarene Basin; also off the Solomon Islands.

References

 Hombron, J.B. & Jacquinot, C.H. (1842-1854). Atlas d'histoire Naturelle zoologie par MM. Hombron et Jacquinot, chirurgiens de l'expédition. Voyage au Pole Sud et dans l'Océanie sur les corvettes l'Astrolabe et la Zélée éxecuté par ordre du roi pendant les années 1837–1838–1839–1840 sous le commandement de M. Dumont-d'Urville, capitaine de vaisseau, publié sous les auspices du département de la marine et sous la direction supérieure de M. Jacquinot, capitaine de vaisseau, commandant de la Zélée. Zoologie. Gide & Cie, Paris.
 Drivas, J. & Jay, M. (1987). Coquillages de La Réunion et de l'Île Maurice. Collection Les Beautés de la Nature. Delachaux et Niestlé: Neuchâtel. ISBN 2-603-00654-1. 159 pp
 Marais J.P. & Kilburn R.N. (2010) Nassariidae. pp. 138–173, in: Marais A.P. & Seccombe A.D. (eds), Identification guide to the seashells of South Africa. Volume 1. Groenkloof: Centre for Molluscan Studies. 376 pp.

External links
 Deshayes, G. P. (1863). Catalogue des mollusques de l'île de la Réunion (Bourbon). Pp. 1-144. In Maillard, L. (Ed.) Notes sur l'Ile de la Réunion. Dentu, Paris
 Cernohorsky W. O. (1984). Systematics of the family Nassariidae (Mollusca: Gastropoda). Bulletin of the Auckland Institute and Museum 14: 1–356
 

Nassariidae
Gastropods described in 1863